Albert Gadd (31 May 1909 – November 2003) was an English professional golfer. He won the French Open in 1933, the Irish Open in 1937 and twice finished in the top 10 in The Open Championship.

Gadd was one of a number of golfing brothers, including George who was in the 1927 Ryder Cup team.

Tournament wins
1933 Open de France
1937 Irish Open, Dunlop-Northern Tournament

Results in major championships

Note: Gadd only played in The Open Championship.

NT = No tournament
WD = withdrew
CUT = missed the half-way cut
"T" indicates a tie for a place

Team appearances
England–Scotland Professional Match (representing England): 1933 (winners), 1935 (winners)
England–Ireland Professional Match (representing England): 1933 (winners)
Llandudno International Golf Trophy (representing England): 1938 (winners)

References

External links
Online copy of "To the Brink of Fame" biography

English male golfers
People from Upton-upon-Severn
Sportspeople from Worcestershire
1909 births
2003 deaths